Kwai Tei New Village ( or ), also referred to as Kwai Tei Resite Area, is a village in the Fo Tan area of Sha Tin District, Hong Kong.

Administration
Kwai Tei Resite Area is a recognized village under the New Territories Small House Policy.

History
Kwai Tei New Village was established in 1979, when the original Kwai Tei village was vacated to make room for a new industrial area.

See also
 Kau Yeuk (Sha Tin)

References

Villages in Sha Tin District, Hong Kong
Fo Tan